A trailer bus is a trailer vehicle designed specifically for the transportation of passengers (a bus). Trailer buses typically comprise one of two forms: 
a semi-trailer pulled by a tractor unit (in the same way as a semi-trailer truck). The tractor unit may either be a purpose-built unit designed specifically for operation with the trailer bus, or a regular conventional tractor unit.
a full trailer pulled by a conventional bus, typically to provide extra capacity. Also referred to as a 'bus trailer'.

Although semi-trailer buses are now typically obsolete and have been retired, full trailer buses attached to conventional buses remain in use in limited applications around the world, including as tourist vehicles.

History
An early trailer bus was designed in Amsterdam in the 1920s as bus designs got longer. As a solution to possible grounding hazards on humped bridges, three prototypes were built in 1924, but proved to be problematic, and later converted to rigid bodies in 1927.

During World War II and in the immediate post-war years, trailer buses were turned to as a simple and economical way of providing bus transport to replace worn out conventional bus fleets. The semi-trailers were basic and uncomfortable, but each could carry more passengers than an ordinary single-decker bus, and nearly as many as a double-decker bus. In India BEST of Mumbai and BMTC of Bangalore had double-decker trailer buses in its fleet during the 1970s and 1980s.

In Australia, 123 semi-trailer type buses were built from 1939. Large purchasers included Parramatta-Ryde Bus Service and Rover Coaches. A 1947 semi-trailer coupled with an American-built 1943 White M3A1 tractor is preserved at the Sydney Bus Museum in Sydney. The Sydney exhibit was the last trailer bus used in NSW, withdrawn in 1977.

Trailer buses were also used in Perth, Western Australia by several private bus companies from 1943 onwards, including Metro Buses (formerly Metropolitan Omnibus), Pioneer Omnibus and Scarborough Bus Services. The units were bodied by various different companies, including Boltons, Campbell & Mannix and Motor Body Builders, a subsidiary of Scarborough Bus Services. From 1958 onwards, many trailer buses passed to the state-owned Metropolitan Transport Trust as the private operators were bought by the Western Australian Government. A number were also purchased by the Western Australian Government Railways from 1945 to 1948, with the trailer bodies built by Fowler Constructions and Campbell & Mannix.

In 1948, ten British-built trailer buses saw service as a staff canteens for London Transport (in country green livery) with one passing to the Cobham Bus Museum in 1972.

A large order for 1,175 buses from the Dutch Railways for buses from Crossley included an order for 250 trailer buses, each to carry 52 seated and 28 standing passengers.  The tractor units were delivered as short Crossley DD42s, and these were matched in the Netherlands with DAF built trailer chassis fitted with bus bodies.

From 1967 to 1968 the Indian city of Mumbai had double decker trailer buses with seating capacity of 100 passengers, run by Brihanmumbai Electric Supply and Transport company. The city of Kolkata and Bengaluru also had such buses.

In the late 1980s, a Mexican-built trailer bus was in test service in the Los Angeles / Orange County area of California. In the 1990s, Orange County Transportation Authority used it on two express routes. The trailer buses were known as Superbuses.

Custom motor/trailer units manufactured by Orion Bus Industries were used from 1985 to 2012 on the Niagara Parks Commission People Mover route in Niagara Falls, Ontario.

In Greece trailer buses are still, often used for tours, usually in small villages. Trailer Buses are also used in some kids' attractions.

Obsolescence
As early as the mid-1940s, trailer buses began to quickly fall out of favour for a variety of factors:

The length of trailer buses made them difficult to negotiate sharp turns at narrow street corners;
Each trailer bus normally required a two-person crew, with the driver in the tractor and the conductor in the semi-trailer;
The perceived danger of a passenger-laden semi-trailer dislodging from its tractor while under way has led to many jurisdictions in the United States, Canada and Australia restrict or prohibit trailer buses.

Trailer buses saw service until at least 1984 in South Africa, possibly due to the rugged terrain in its remote areas, and the availability of specialist bus builders as opposed to truck dealers and basic body builders.

Trailer buses are still in service in Cuba, where they were introduced under the nickname of "camellos" ("camels", from the twin-humped shape of the trailers) during the Special Period after the fall of the Soviet Union.  , the trailer buses were being gradually retired from service in Havana, replaced by Chinese-made buses.

Nonetheless, the Munich transit authority ordered a batch of trailer buses from Solaris with deliveries starting in 2013. The buses were intended for service on the city's busiest routes. The advantages of such buses were the ability to attach or detach the trailer depending on demand, spaciousness and flexibility.

Gallery

Semi-trailer buses

Full trailer buses

References

External links

Images of trailer buses in South Africa
Images of trailer buses in South Africa
Α trailer bus that was used in Greece
Another Trailer bus that was used in Greece
Another Trailer bus that was used in Greece

Buses by type
Articulated buses